David G. Taylor has worked as a senior producer and director for the BBC. He is a member of the Advisory Council of the National College of Music.

References

External links 
 Filmography at NYT
 IMDB page (possibly mixing two people with the same name)

Living people
Year of birth missing (living people)
BBC people
British television producers
British television directors
Place of birth missing (living people)